

JavaOne is an annual conference first organized in 1996 by Sun Microsystems to discuss Java technologies, primarily among Java developers. It was held in San Francisco, California, typically running from a Monday to Thursday in summer months (early on) or in early fall months (later). Technical sessions and Birds of a Feather (BOF) sessions on a variety of Java-related topics were held throughout the week.

The show was very popular; for the 1999 edition, there were 20,000 attendees at the Moscone Center.

For many years, the conference was hosted by Sun executive and Java evangelist John Gage.

In 1999, the conference played host to an event called the Hackathon, a challenge set by Gage.  Attendees were to write a program in Java for the new Palm V using the infrared port to communicate with other Palm users and register the device on the Internet.

During the 2008 conference, seventy Moscone Center staff members and three attendees were sickened by an outbreak of norovirus.

After the acquisition of Sun by Oracle Corporation in 2010, the conference was held concurrently with Oracle OpenWorld. The conference was moved from Moscone Center to hotels on nearby Mason Street. In some years, one block of Mason was closed and covered with a tent, which formed part of the conference venue.

In April 2018, Oracle announced that the JavaOne conference would be discontinued, in favor of a more general programming conference called Oracle Code One. The CodeOne conference ran for two years.

In March 2022, Oracle announced that JavaOne will return in October 2022, reclaiming the position the now defunct CodeOne conference once occupied. The conference has moved to Las Vegas from its original location in San Francisco.

Show device

Several of the conferences highlighted a hardware device, typically made available to attendees before it is sold to the general public, or at a steep discount:
 1998: Java ring
 1999: Palm V
 2002: Sharp Zaurus
 2004: Homepod, a wireless MP3 device from Gloolabs
 2006: SavaJe Jasper S20 phone
 2007: RS Media programmable robot
 2008: Sentilla Perk Kit, Pulse Smartpen, Sony Ericsson K850i
 2009: HTC Diamond with JavaFX pre-installed

CommunityOne

From 2007 to 2009, an associated one-day event, CommunityOne, was held, for the broader free and open-source developer community.

In 2009, CommunityOne expanded to New York City (CommunityOne East, March 18–19) and to Oslo, Norway (CommunityOne North, April 15). The third annual CommunityOne in San Francisco took place from June 1–3, 2009, at Moscone Center.

Tracks included:

 Cloud Platforms – Development and deployment in the cloud
 Social and Collaborative Platforms – Social networks and Web 2.0 trends
 RIAs and Scripting – Rich Internet Applications, scripting and tools
 Web Platforms – Dynamic languages, databases, and Web servers
 Server-side Platforms – SOA, tools, application servers, and databases
 Mobile Development – Mobile platforms, devices, tools and application development
 Operating Systems and Infrastructure – Performance, virtualization, and native development
 Free and Open – Open-source projects, business models, and trends

CommunityOne was discontinued after the acquisition of Sun by Oracle.

See also

References

External links

Moscone Center
JavaOne 2009 Blog Coverage

Java platform
Computer conferences
Recurring events established in 1996
Recurring events established in 2007
Sun Microsystems